In mathematics, a spectral space is a topological space that is homeomorphic to the spectrum of a commutative ring. It is sometimes also called a coherent space because of the connection to coherent topos.

Definition

Let X be a topological space and let K(X) be the set of all 
compact open subsets of X. Then X is said to be spectral if it satisfies all of the following conditions:
X is compact and T0.
 K(X) is a basis of open subsets of X.
 K(X) is closed under finite intersections.
 X is sober, i.e., every nonempty irreducible closed subset of X has a (necessarily unique) generic point.

Equivalent descriptions

Let X be a topological space. Each of the following properties are equivalent 
to the property of X being spectral:

X is homeomorphic to a projective limit of finite T0-spaces.
X is homeomorphic to the spectrum of a bounded distributive lattice L. In this case, L is isomorphic (as a bounded lattice) to the lattice K(X) (this is called Stone representation of distributive lattices).
X is homeomorphic to the spectrum of a commutative ring.
X is the topological space determined by a Priestley space.
X is a T0 space whose frame of open sets is coherent (and every coherent frame comes from a unique spectral space in this way).

Properties

Let X be a spectral space and let K(X) be as before. Then:
K(X) is a bounded sublattice of subsets of X.
Every closed subspace of X is spectral.
An arbitrary intersection of compact and open subsets of X (hence of elements from K(X)) is again spectral.
X is T0 by definition, but in general not T1. In fact a spectral space is T1 if and only if it is Hausdorff (or T2) if and only if it is a boolean space if and only if K(X) is a boolean algebra.
X can be seen as a pairwise Stone space.

Spectral maps
A spectral map f: X → Y between spectral spaces X and Y is a continuous map such that the preimage of every open and compact subset of Y under f is  again compact.

The category of spectral spaces, which has spectral maps as morphisms, is dually equivalent to the category of bounded distributive lattices (together with morphisms of such lattices). In this anti-equivalence, a spectral space X corresponds to the lattice K(X).

Citations

References

M. Hochster (1969). Prime ideal structure in commutative rings. Trans. Amer. Math. Soc., 142 43—60
.
 

General topology
Algebraic geometry
Lattice theory